Cikó is a village in Tolna County, Hungary.

Cikó's population is predominantly Hungarian (99.2%).

References

Populated places in Tolna County